Demazière may refer to:

 9641 Demazière, a main belt asteroid.
 Didier Demazière, a French sociologist.
 Martine De Mazière (born 1960), Belgian atmospheric scientist, namesake of the asteroid.